The Memminger Ach (or seldom Memminger Aach) is a river of Bavaria, Germany.

The Memminger Ach is a tributary of the Iller, part of the Danube river system and forms an important part of the landscape in the town of Memmingen. It flows into the Iller near Pleß.

See also
List of rivers of Bavaria

References

Rivers of Bavaria
Rivers of Germany